Air Vice Marshal Hugh Vivian Champion de Crespigny,  (8 April 1897 – 20 June 1969), often referred to as Vivian Champion de Crespigny, was a Royal Flying Corps pilot who fought in France during the First World War, and senior Royal Air Force officer who commanded British Air Forces in Persia and Iraq during the Second World War.

Early years
De Crespigny was born in Brighton, Victoria, the fourth son of Philip Champion de Crespigny (4 January 1850 – 11 March 1927), manager of the Bank of Victoria in Melbourne, and Philip's second wife Sophia Montgomery Grattan née Beggs (1870 – 1936). He was educated at Brighton Grammar School. In August 1914, following the outbreak of the First World War, he enlisted with the 7th Battalion of the Australian Army as a private.
In 1915 he was recommended for a commission in the Suffolk Regiment, and from there graduated to the Royal Flying Corps' special reserve.

RAF career
De Crespigny joined the Special Reserve of the Royal Flying Corps in 1915. He went on to be Officer Commanding No. 29 Squadron on the Western Front and then Officer Commanding No. 65 Squadron also on the Western Front. 
Apart from three months' sick leave, he was at the front in France continuously from June 1915, and was promoted Major in April 1917.
After the war he went to India where he commanded No. 60 Squadron and then No. 39 Squadron and finally No. 2 (Indian) Wing.

He served in the Second World War as Air Officer Commanding No. 25 (Armament) Group, as Air Officer Commanding Air Headquarters Iraq and then as Air Officer Commanding No. 21 (Training) Group.

In 1945 De Crespigny joined the (British) Labour Party, and stood as their candidate for the British Parliament in Newark, but was narrowly beaten by the sitting Conservative member, Lt-Col. Sidney Shephard.
He was a leader in the campaign to fly great numbers of children from the devastated regions of Germany to England before the winter of 1945, when it was predicted millions of homeless would die from the cold.

De Crespigny retired from the RAF in 1945. and was appointed Regional Commissioner for Schleswig-Holstein for the Control Commission for Germany one of four civilians appointed to oversee the de-Nazification of Germany and Austria.
He oversaw relief efforts for the area, much of the population being in a pitiable condition, exacerbated by mass migration from East Germany, and with rising incidence of tuberculosis.

In 1948 De Crespigny was succeeded as commissioner by William Asbury and stayed in Kiel as British consul until 1956. He later lived at Vierville in Natal, South Africa.
He died at Pietermaritzburg, Natal, South Africa.

Recognition
De Crespigny was awarded the Military Cross in May 1916.

He was invested as a Companion of the Order of the Bath (CB) in the 1943 New Year Honours for his service with the RAF during the Second World War.

Family
De Crespigny married Sylvia Ethel Usher in Fovant, Wiltshire, on 7 October 1926. They had four sons:
Robert Vivian Champion de Crespigny (12 October 1927 - 14 December 1929)
Hugh Philip Champion de Crespigny (1928 – 24 April 2004)
Anthony Richard Champion de Crespigny (26 September 1930 – 15 November 2008)
Julian Augustus Claude Champion de Crespigny (1934–1974)

Notes

References

1897 births
1969 deaths
People educated at Brighton Grammar School
Military personnel from Melbourne
Suffolk Regiment officers
Aviators from Melbourne
Companions of the Order of the Bath
Recipients of the Military Cross
Recipients of the Croix de Guerre 1914–1918 (France)
Recipients of the Distinguished Flying Cross (United Kingdom)
Royal Air Force air marshals of World War II
Royal Flying Corps officers
British Army personnel of World War I
Royal Air Force personnel of World War I
People from Brighton, Victoria